The German Workers' Party (Deutsche Arbeiterpartei, DAP) in Austria-Hungary was the predecessor of the Austrian and Czechoslovak Deutsche Nationalsozialistische Arbeiterpartei (DNSAP), founded on 14 November 1903, in Aussig (Ústí nad Labem), Bohemia. Its founders were Karl Hermann Wolf, an earlier adherent of Georg von Schönerer, and Ferdinand Burschofsky.

The German Workers' Party sought to defend German interests in the Czech lands. Its party program was founded on Pan-Germanism, and was vehemently anti-Slavic, anti-Catholic, anti-Marxist and anti-capitalist.

In the elections for the Imperial Council in 1905 and 1911, the party obtained 3 seats. Hans Knirsch was chosen as parliamentary chairman in 1912. At the end of the First World War, Walter Riehl would take over as leader of Austrian part of the party, which would be renamed the Deutsche Nationalsozialistische Arbeiterpartei (DNSAP). Concurrently, Hans Knirsch would take up the leadership of the Czechoslovak DNSAP, a forerunner of the Sudeten German National Socialist Party.

See also
German Workers' Party (Germany)

References

1903 establishments in Austria-Hungary
20th-century establishments in Bohemia
Anti-capitalist political parties
Anti-Catholic organizations
Anti-communism
Antisemitism in Austria
Anti-Slavic sentiment
German nationalism in Austria
German nationalist political parties
Pan-Germanism
Political parties established in 1903
Political parties in Austria-Hungary
Ústí nad Labem
Ethnic organizations based in Austria-Hungary
Nationalist parties in Austria
Anti-communist parties